The Château de la Jarthe  is a château during the 12th century in Coursac, Dordogne, Nouvelle-Aquitaine, France.

Châteaux in Dordogne
Monuments historiques of Dordogne